(TMS) is a Japanese monthly magazine on railway modelling published by Kigei Publishing. It has been published in Japan since 1947.

History
The magazine was first issued in 1947, produced by Haruo Ishibashi and Kiyo Yamazaki. Early editions were mimeographed, with no photographs, and hand-written diagrams. Following the death of Yamazaki, Ishibashi became editor-in-chief of the magazine and president of the publisher in 2003. The magazine celebrated its 800th issue in January 2014, although the magazine had actually been issued 860 times including special editions.
In April 2019, Noriyuki Natori (former editor-in chief of "Rail Magazine") became editor in chief of this magazine, and Yoshihiro Imon became the president of the Kigei Publishing.

Circulation
The magazine had a peak circulation of around 30,000 in the 1970s, but this had fallen to around 10,000 by 2014.

See also
 List of railroad-related periodicals

References

1947 establishments in Japan
Magazines established in 1947
Magazines published in Tokyo
Monthly magazines published in Japan
Railway culture in Japan
Rail transport magazines
Rail transport modelling publications